Agency Plains is a plateau just north of the city of Madras, Oregon, United States. The area is composed of arable land and was the homestead area of the Gard, Campbell, and Ramsey families. A variety of seed crops are raised on the farmland, and before irrigation came to the area it was covered in dryland wheat. The area is roughly bisected by U.S. Route 26.

References

Landforms of Jefferson County, Oregon